Pimelia angulata is a species of darkling beetles in the subfamily Pimeliinae.

Subspecies
Pimelia angulata angulata Fabricius, 1775 
Pimelia angulata angulosa Olivier, 1795 
Pimelia angulata antiaegypta Koch, 1937

Description
The body is black, slightly glossy. The elytra show a few lines of small spikes or short tubercles. These beetles are diurnal, emerging in early morning and late evening but hiding in small groups under the sand during the hot hours of the day.

Distribution and habitat
This species is present in the lower Egypt, in the northern and south-eastern Sinai, Mauritania, Israel and in Sudan. It is adapted to arid climates and desert environments.

Bibliography
 Niccole D. Rech The Effect of Temperature on Oviposition in Pimelia Angulata (Coleoptera: Tenebrionidae) Minot State University, 2002
 Adolf Andres Note sur Pimelia angulata Fak. et espèces voisines et description d'une variété nouvelle (1929)
 FIORI G., 1954 – Morfologia addominale, anatomia ed istologia degli apparati genitali di «Pimelia angulata Confalonierii» Grid. (Coleoptera Tenebrionidae) e formazione dello spermatoforo. - Boll. Ist. Entom. Univ. Bologna

References

Pimeliinae
Beetles described in 1775
Taxa named by Johan Christian Fabricius
Fauna of Egypt